Belle Alliance is an Italianate and Greek Revival plantation house in Assumption Parish, Louisiana, U.S.A. It is the namesake of the unincorporated community of Belle Alliance.

During the 1770s, this  plot was granted to Don Juan Vives, a physician and military officer of the Spanish government. The Belle Alliance plantation house was built by Charles Anton Kock, a successful planter who used the forced labor of enslaved people to grow sugar and also owned the St. Emma Plantation around 1846.

The plantation house was listed on the National Register of Historic Places in 1998.

See also
National Register of Historic Places listings in Assumption Parish, Louisiana

References

External links

Belle Alliance Plantation website

Houses in Assumption Parish, Louisiana
Houses on the National Register of Historic Places in Louisiana
Historic American Buildings Survey in Louisiana
Italianate architecture in Louisiana
Houses completed in 1846
Plantation houses in Louisiana
National Register of Historic Places in Assumption Parish, Louisiana